To maximize TV ratings, as well as to protect the NFL's ability to sell TV rights collectively, games televised on ESPN or the NFL Network are blacked out in each of the primary markets of both teams (the Green Bay Packers have two primary markets, Green Bay and Milwaukee, a remnant of when they played some home games in Milwaukee each season, see below) under syndicated exclusivity regulations as the league sells via broadcast syndication a package featuring that team's games.

This station does not need to have affiliate connections with a national broadcaster of NFL games, though owned-and-operated stations of ABC and Hearst Television (even those Hearst stations not affiliated with ABC, and including their one independent station in the Tampa-St. Petersburg market) have first right of refusal due to both ESPN and ABC's common ownership by The Walt Disney Company (Hearst holds a 20% stake in ESPN). In recent years, the ABC O&Os have passed on airing the game, opting instead to air the network's Monday night schedule which includes the successful Dancing with the Stars. In other markets, stations who are the affiliates of MyNetworkTV or The CW (and, in at least one case, an independent station) have out bid more established local broadcasters in some markets. However, the home team's market must be completely served by the station and that broadcast can only air if the game is sold out within 72 hours of kick-off.

Under the agreement for the 2014 season between CBS and the NFL Network for Thursday Night Football simulcasts during the first half of the season, local rights to such games that are not carried by CBS are awarded to the markets' CBS affiliates, rather than syndicated.  If the CBS affiliate opts out of the deal, the NFL will offer the package by syndication, typically with the Monday Night package. The CBS/NFL Network deal was extended for the 2015 season on January 18, 2015. For the 2016 season, two midseason TNF games were NFL Network-exclusive but produced by NBC; the NBC affiliates in those markets with teams competing carried those games in-market. With the 2018 move of the package to Fox, the two NFL Network-exclusive games produced by Fox actually varied between NBC and CBS affiliates rather than being exclusive to the Fox stations in each market.

On November 8, 1987, the first NFL game aired on ESPN was played between the New England Patriots and New York Giants. Technically, the game was only simulcast in the Boston market, with a separate broadcast produced for the New York market by ESPN sister property WABC-TV – at the time, WABC's union contract prohibited non-union workers (like those of ESPN) from working on live events broadcast on the station. This marked the only time since the AFL–NFL merger that a regular season game was locally produced for TV. The WABC broadcast featured WABC's own Corey McPherrin doing play-by-play, and Frank Gifford and Lynn Swann from Monday Night Football doing color commentary.

Note: Teams listed in italics are teams that have since relocated.

American Football Conference

National Football Conference

Notes
As previously mentioned, ESPN's games were typically simulcast on regular over-the-air television stations in each participating team's local market so that households without cable television could still see the telecasts. During the first season, the game between the New York Giants and New England Patriots (the very first regular season game aired by ESPN) saw WABC-TV (ABC's flagship station out of New York City) produce a completely separate telecast from ESPN's. The reason behind this was that WABC's union contract at the time prohibited non-union workers, such as those at ESPN, from producing live events for WABC. The WABC broadcasts involved play-by-play man Corey McPherrin and Frank Gifford and Lynn Swann on color commentary.

In some cases, the ESPN's Monday Night Football program is moved to a sister station of the ABC affiliate to air live instead (for example, until 2011 in the Minneapolis–St. Paul market, when NBC affiliate KARE took over as the local broadcaster of MNF games, if the Minnesota Vikings were playing a game being simulcast on local ABC affiliate KSTP-TV, sister independent station KSTC-TV aired DWTS live). In 2016, for the opening week Monday night game (the second in a doubleheader) between the Los Angeles Rams and San Francisco 49ers, the ABC-owned stations in both markets (KABC-TV and KGO-TV) would broadcast World News Tonight and DWTS in their live Eastern Time Zone slots, thus airing at 3:30 p.m. and 5 p.m. PT respectively.

Upon the original launch of the Thursday and Saturday night games, few television service providers carried the NFL Network due to disputes during the network's terms in its carriage contracts during negotiations. These disputes were magnified throughout the 2007 season, as two high-profile matchups were to be broadcast by the network. The first was a matchup between the Dallas Cowboys and Green Bay Packers which was scheduled for the week after Thanksgiving and saw both teams at 10-1, vying for the top seed in the NFC, and the second was Week 17 Saturday night game between the New England Patriots and the New York Giants, where the Patriots had a chance to become the first team since the 1972 Miami Dolphins to end a regular season undefeated. In the first case, fans were displeased that a matchup between two teams at such a critical point in the season was not available on broadcast television except in the Dallas and Green Bay markets. To avoid such a problem with the potential sixteenth victory for the Patriots, CBS and NBC bought broadcast rights to the game so it could be seen by a nationwide audience on both cable and broadcast television. This ended up causing another controversy, however, as the move by the networks infringed on the exclusivity that would normally have been enjoyed by WWOR-TV in New York City and WCVB-TV in Boston, which were the Giants' and Patriots' respective local over-the-air broadcasters for cable-televised games (the game aired on these stations, as well as on WCBS-TV, WNBC, WBZ-TV and WHDH in the teams' market areas).

On October 27, 1991, CBS aired Game 7 of the World Series nationally on that night yet it was pushed aside to WDCA IND 20 so WUSA could air the Washington Redskins game against the New York Giants. 

Green Bay simulcast info: All TNT and NFLN games; ESPN games 1994-2005: WFRV 5 (ABC thru 1991 season, CBS thereafter). ESPN games thru '93 season: WLUK 11 (NBC) (Did not become Fox until 1995 season). ESPN games from 2006-present: WBAY 2 (ABC).

The NFL's anti-siphoning regulations affect both Monday Night Football on ESPN and NFL Network games. In the markets of the participating teams, the respective cable channel is blacked out. ESPN games air via broadcast syndication to an over-the-air station. Typically, the team's flagship station for the preseason games will hold such rights, as teams will usually sell the preseason, local ESPN, and if the CBS affiliate in that market declines the option, the NFL Network games as one package. Only over-the-air stations in the market of the participating teams (with the Green Bay Packers having two such markets) may bid on this syndicated package. Starting in 2014, CBS affiliates in the primary markets in question have the primary option to NFL Network-only games; if the local affiliate declines the option (as was in Cincinnati), the NFL will implement the same syndicated package rule. In 2016 and 2017, with the TNF package split between CBS and NBC, this depended on which network produces the game for NFL Network. With Fox taking over the TNF package in 2018, Fox affiliates will have the primary option of simulcasting NFL Network games. After the Senate Judiciary Committee threatened the NFL's antitrust exemption if it did not make the game available nationwide, the NFL relented and made the game the first in league history to be simulcast on three networks. The game aired on the NFL Network, as planned; on NBC, which would normally have the rights to prime time games; and, since the away team was an AFC team, on CBS. (WCVB in Boston holds the rights to the NFL's syndicated package for Patriots games, causing this game to be available on 3 over-the-air stations in the Boston TV market). This however, did not lead to the NFL offering this package to other channels; the games remain on the NFL Network as of 2019, although cable coverage of NFL Network has increased in the intervening period.

If the blacked-out nationally televised game is being shown on a cable network (such as ESPN or the NFL Network), all cable and satellite television providers in markets that are within the 75-mile radius, in addition already to the primary market of the home team (which is already blacked out), must black out the cable broadcaster's feed to customers in affected markets during the game (this is a condition of the channels' agreements with both the league and the providers). In addition, the game is not simulcast on a local broadcast station in the blacked-out markets. Local stations would still be able to show highlights during their newscasts after the game has concluded. In areas where the game is blacked out, ESPN and the NFL Network would generally offer alternate programming (ESPN traditionally switches to a simulcast of ESPNews). As ESPN and NFL Network games featuring the local teams are syndicated in the local markets under the NFL's anti-siphoning policies, the station that holds local rights to the cable broadcasts but cannot show the games originally scheduled to be carried would either run their own alternate programming or, if affiliated with a major network, show the regularly scheduled network programming for that night. During the pre-season, blacked out games can be aired in their entirety, but only on tape delay (generally after late-evening newscasts).

References

External links
History of Cable NFL OTA's
Cable NFL Games on local TV

National Football League lists
History of National Football League broadcasting
 
Local sports television programming in the United States
Sunday Night Football
ESPN
NFL Network
Turner Sports
Thursday Night Football
Simulcasts
Monday Night Football